Jalia Kaibarta  (or Jaliya Kaibartta, or: Jāliya Kaibbarta, possibly also: Jalia Kaibartya) is a community comprising people of low ritual status, fishermen, who later acquired respectable caste identities within the larger Hindu fold, helped by their commercial prosperity and Vaishnavite affiliations, through Sanskritisation. They are traditionally engaged in the occupation of fishing and originally belonged to Assam, West Bengal, Odisha and eastern Bihar along with Bangladesh, Nepal, Bhutan. The Kaibartas were initially considered a single tribe divided into two groups, Haliya and Jaliya Kaibarta, where the Haliya Kaibarta are considered to be superior than the latter. Jaliya Kaibartas are categorised as a Scheduled Caste are the second largest among the 16 SCs in Assam under the name Kaibarta/Jalia. Many of the Jalia Kaibarta under the influence of Garamur satradhikar gave up their traditional occupation of fishing and divided themselves into – mach mara and mach na-mara. 

In Brahmavaivarta, a Kaibarta is said to be born to a Kshatriya father and a Vaishya mother, while other consider Kaibarta to be a Hinduised word of Kevatta which refer to  a class of fishermens in the Buddhist Jatakas. They are also claimed to have their own priest.

The first proto-Assamese manuscript, in the form of Caryapādas, was written by a Buddhist priest, known in Tibetan language as Lui-pā, who is identified with Matsyendranātha, a member of the fishermen community of mediaeval Kāmarūpa, which later became Kaibartas.

Medieval Oriyan poet and Vaishnav saint Achyutananda Dasa wrote kaibarta Gita which narrates the origin, growth, functions and roles of this community.

Notable people
Bhupen Hazarika, musician, playback singer, lyricist, poet, actor and filmmaker from Assam, awarded with the Dadasaheb Phalke Award and the Bharat Ratna
Jayanta Hazarika, musician, playback singer from Assam

See also
 Mahishya
 Guha (Ramayana)

Notes

References

Indian castes
Fishing castes
Ethnic groups in Odisha
Scheduled Castes of Assam
Scheduled Castes of West Bengal